Scapa Flow is a body of water in the Orkney Islands.

Scapa Flow may also refer to:
 Scapa Flow (band), an electronic body music band
 Scapa Flow (film), a 1930 German film
 Scapa Flow (horse), an American Thoroughbred racehorse
 Scapa Flow (British horse), dam of Pharos

See also
 Scapa (disambiguation)
 Scuttling of the German fleet at Scapa Flow